Farmen 2021 (The Farm 2021) is the seventeenth season of the Norwegian version of The Farm reality television show. This season takes place on a farm located in Østre Toten where contestants need to live on the farm like it was a century prior. The season premiered on 21 September 2021.

Format
Fourteen contestants are chosen from the outside world. Each week one contestant is selected the Farmer of the Week. In the first week, the contestants choose the Farmer. Since week 2, the Farmer is chosen by the contestant evicted in the previous week.

Nomination process
The Farmer of the Week nominates two people (a man and a woman) as the Butlers. The others must decide which Butler is the first to go to the Battle. That person then chooses the second person (from the same sex) for the Battle and also the type of battle (a quiz, extrusion, endurance, sleight). The Battle winner must win two duels. The Battle loser is evicted from the game.

Finishing order
(ages stated are at time of contest)

Torpet 
After the contestants are eliminated, they are taken to Torpet where they'll be given a second chance to try and re-enter the competition. Three contestants from previous seasons return to compete against the new arrivals to try and fight their way back to earn a spot and return to The Farm.

Challengers 
On the fourth week, three challengers come to the farm where they'll live for one week while doing chores and getting to know the other contestants. At the end of the week, the contestants on the farm decide which one is allowed to stay on the farm and which two fight in a duel to determine who stays on The Farm and who goes home.

The game

References

External links

The Farm (franchise)
Norwegian reality television series
2021 Norwegian television seasons